Bealings may refer to:

 Bealings railway station
 Great Bealings, Suffolk
 Little Bealings, Suffolk